Alberto Rescio (born 14 October 1987 in Campi Salentina) is an Italian professional football player currently playing for Lega Pro Seconda Divisione team S.S. Barletta Calcio on loan from A.S. Bari.

See also
Football in Italy
List of football clubs in Italy

References

External links
 

1987 births
Living people
Italian footballers
S.S. Fidelis Andria 1928 players
Association football midfielders